Canillita is a 1936 Argentine musical film directed and written by Lisandro de la Tea and Manuel Roneima and starring Amanda Ledesma (pictured). The film premiered on 26 March 1936 in Buenos Aires.

Cast
Amanda Ledesma   
Adolfo Alsina   
Príncipe Azul   
Arizona Boys   
El Pibe Buenos Aires   
Héctor Calcaño   
Pedro Caldarella   
Gregorio Cicarelli   
Antonio Corrado   
Lopecito   
Pedro Maffia   
Sabina Olmos   
Roberto Paéz   
Benita Puértolas   
Manuel Roneima   
Gabino Seti

External links
 

1936 films
1930s Spanish-language films
Tango films
Argentine black-and-white films
1936 musical films
Argentine musical films
1930s Argentine films